John Ray Sechler, known as Curly Seckler, (December 25, 1919 – December 27, 2017) was an American bluegrass musician. He played with Lester Flatt and Earl Scruggs in their band the Foggy Mountain Boys from 1949 to 1962, among other bluegrass acts during his career in music.

Early years
Born to Carrie and Calvin Sechler in China Grove, North Carolina, on December 25, 1919, "Curly" was destined to play Bluegrass music. In his youth and formative years, Seckler learned to play music from his parents. His father, Calvin, played old time fiddle, harmonica, and autoharp, while his mother taught him how to play the organ. Seckler, like most of his local contemporaries, worked a life of labor in a local cotton mill with his brothers. However, this labor at the mill did not hamper his musical development, Seckler found time to keep up his love for music, expanding his musical knowledge by picking up the five-string banjo. Seckler began learning the instrument from local musician, Happy Trexler.

Career
In the early years of his professional career, Seckler accompanied his brothers George and Duard, playing the tenor banjo and providing vocal harmonies. The group was called the Yodeling Rangers and were propelled to local stardom in 1935, when they were invited to perform daily on the radio in Salisbury, North Carolina.

With a new name, the Trail Riders, the Secklers soon began playing steadily throughout the south-eastern US. Soon the word got around and the Trail Riders caught the eye of Charlie Monroe, brother of Bill Monroe, and former guitarist of the Monroe Brothers. After their breakup, Charlie was looking for new musicians to play with on the emerging Bluegrass circuit. He proposed that Seckler join him on tour. The nineteen-year-old agreed and received twenty dollars a week.

Seckler continued to enjoy success on the Bluegrass touring circuit and in 1949 joined Lester Flatt, Earl Scruggs, and the rest of the Foggy Mountain Boys band. In this new ensemble, Seckler continued to sing tenor harmonies, but switched to the mandolin. In this same year, Bill Monroe released a song called "Traveling This Lonesome Road" which Curly and his wife Juanita had written but hadn't copyrighted. Bill recorded the tune with Mac Wiseman and released it in 1949. Curly left the Foggy Mountain Boys briefly in March 1951 and was replaced by Everette Lilly. During this time Curly went to WCYB to work with The Sauceman Brothers & the Green Valley Boys for a short period before joining the Stanley Brothers and replacing Bobby Osbourne. It was only a couple weeks after playing with the Stanley's that Curly left the band due to Carter Stanley's drinking habit. After leaving the Stanley's, Curly started a new group called the Cumberland Mountain Boys with Jim & Jesse McReynolds to replace Flatt & Scruggs's position at the Kentucky Barn dance in Versailles, KY, but before they were ever able to play at the barn dance the venue changed owners and ended up closing down. At this point Flatt & Scruggs offered Curly Seckler his position back in the Foggy Mountain Boys band and Curly rejoined at the end of 1951.  Curly stayed with Flatt and Scruggs until 1962 when the band ended, recording over 130 songs while in the band. After Flatt and Scruggs, Curly took a break from the music business until 1973 when Lester Flatt asked him to be a part of his group, the Nashville Grass band. Upon Lester Flatt's death in 1979, Seckler became the leader of the Nashville Grass band and continued playing with the band. Seckler held this position until his retirement in 1994 ( Seckler AP).

Later years and death
The International Bluegrass Music Association honored Seckler in 2004 by inducting him into its International Bluegrass Music Hall of Fame; Seckler was inducted into the North Carolina Music Hall of Fame in 2010. His release of "Sixty Years of Bluegrass with My Friends" in 2005 on the Copper Creek label solidified Seckler's place as one of the pioneers of the genre and steward of customs and traditions. Throughout his career, Seckler played with Jim and Jesse McReynolds, Mac Wiseman, the Stanley Brothers, the Nashville Grass, Doyle Lawson, and many others. Seckler died in his sleep on December 27, 2017, just two days after his 98th birthday.

Further reading

Stanley, Ralph. "Man Of Constant Sorrow" Gotham Books. 2009.

References

External links
Interview with Curly Seckler NAMM Oral History Library (2011)

1919 births
2017 deaths
People from China Grove, North Carolina
Bluegrass musicians from North Carolina
Country musicians from North Carolina
Foggy Mountain Boys members